The Vancouver Metro Soccer League (VMSL) is a soccer men's league operating in British Columbia, Canada primarily in the Lower Mainland area.

History
The league is an amateur league, and does not compete against or promote teams to the Canadian Soccer Pyramid. The Premier Division provides the highest level of amateur play in British Columbia. This league has produced several British Columbia Soccer Association Province Cup Champions, including the last 9 consecutive champions.  In 2007, the league also produced a runner-up to the Open Canada Cup in Columbus Clan FC.

The league has been home to several former USL First Division players, including Johnny Sulentic (Croatia SC), Alfredo Valente (Coquitlam Metro-Ford), David Morris (Pegasus FC), Jason Jordan (RCIU Legends), Jeff Clarke (Surrey United), Steve Kindel (Columbus Clan FC) and Ivor Evans (Richmond FC Olympics), who generally played in this league while free agents.

Due to COVID-19, the 2020-2021 season was canceled, and teams competed in their respective Cohort Cups. The 12 premier teams were split into 3 groups of 4, participating in "The William Azzi - Premier Cup." Likewise, the 12 division 1 teams participated in "The Ruben Tremarco - Div 1 Cup." The 24 division 2 teams participated in "The Bob Allen - Div 2 Cup," competing in 6 groups of 4. Despite the promising start to the Cohort Cups, the league was forced to postpone until further notice in mid-November because of the new Covid-19 guidelines put in place by the Government of British Columbia.

2022-23 Teams

Premier

 BB5 United CCB
 BCT Rovers Hurricanes A
 CMFSC A Wolves
 Coastal FC A
 Columbus FC A
 Croatia SC A
 Inter EDC A
 Port Moody SC A
 SFC Pegasus A
 VUFC Hibernian
 West Van FC A
 Westside FC A

Division 1

 Bby Selects W Eagles
 CMFSC Lupi
 FC Romania A
 FC Serbia United A
 GN Sporting Club
 MAFC A
 Metropolitan FC A
 NVFC Norvan A
 Rinos A Fury
 SFC Supra A Coastal
 Vancouver Greencaps A
 VUFC Snipers A

Division 2

 BCT Hurricane Tigers
 Bingers Army A
 Bingers Army Whistler
 Bombastic FC A
 Columbus FC B
 FC Serbia United Narps
 France FC - FFC
 Gastown Astro FC A
 Guildford FC
 Inter EDC B
 Lobbans FC
 MAFC Artistic
 Marpole Tropics
 Meraloma FC A
 NK Hrvat A
 NVFC Norvan United
 Richmond FC Hibs
 Shaheen FC A
 Siaron A
 Strathcona Primo FC A
 Vancouver Harps FC A
 West Van FC B
 Westside FC United
 WS Strikers FC

Division 3

 Alemania FC X
 Alemania FC Z
 BCT Rovers Hurricanes B
 Bombastic FC B
 CMFSC Young Boys
 Coastal FC B
 Cosmos FC
 Euro FC
 GFC United Lions A
 Mainland Athletic
 Metropolitan FC B
 Mlima FC
 Musqueam Spurs
 New West SC A
 Nottingham Deforestation
 NVFC Lions
 NVFC Norvan Storm
 PCOV Benfica
 Port Moody SC B
 Port Moody SC C
 Redeemer Eagles FC
 Regent College FC
 Rinos East Van
 Royal City Rangers
 SC FC
 SFC Temple A
 SST FC
 Strathcona Primo FC B
 Twin Arrows
 VAFC Kray United
 Vancouver Greencaps B
 Vancouver Harps FC B
 VUFC Balaclava
 West Coast Celts
 West Hounds FC
 Westside FC Athletic

Division 4

 AC Vansterdamn Reign
 CAUFC Mustangs
 Cleves FC
 Dinamo Anatolia
 FC Serbia United C
 GFC United Lions B
 Kitsilano Athletic FC
 Metropolitan FC C
 New West SC B
 Unathletico Vancouver
 VAFC A Dynamo
 Vancouver Patagonia FC

Imperial Cup
Teams in the VMSL play for the Imperial Cup, which has been contested since 1913.

Imperial Cup Champions:

1913 Thistle FC
1914 No Competition  
1915 No Competition
1916 No Competition
1917 No Competition
1918 No Competition
1919 No Competition
1920 Thistle FC  
1921 Wallace FC
1922 South Hill Army & Navy
1923 South Hill Army & Navy
1924 North Van Elks FC  
1925 St. Andrew's FC   
1926 Sapperton FC
1927 No Competition
1928 No Competition
1929 No Competition
1930 No Competition
1931 No Competition
1932 No Competition
1933 No Competition
1934 Art Monument FC
1935 Unknown
1936 Unknown
1937 St. Regis FC
1938 Excelsior Lumber
1939 Unknown
1940 Kerrisdale FC
1941 Unknown
1942 Richmond FC
1943 Unknown
1944 Army FC
1945 Norvan FC
1946 Vancouver United
1947 Collingwood FC
1948 Norquay FC
1949 Rainier Hotel FC
1950 South Hill FC and James Bldrs.
1951 Varsity FC
1952 A. N. & AF Unit #100   
1953 Vancouver Pilseners
1954 Vancouver Pilseners
1955 Dubbell Wear FC   
1956 Royal Oaks FC
1957 Capilanos FC
1958 Capilanos FC
1959 Wallace FC
1960 Vancouver Firefighters
1961 Vancouver Firefighters
1962 Royal Oaks FC
1963 University of BC
1964 Mount Pleasant Legion
1965 Vancouver Friuli
1966 North Shore United
1967 Lobbans FC
1968 Royal Oaks FC
1969 Glenavon FC and  Lobbans
1970 Glenavon FC
1971 Lobbans FC
1972 Royal Oak Astors
1973 Vancouver Firefighters
1974 North Shore United
1975 North Shore Paul’s
1976 Unknown
1977 Italian Canadian Columbus
1978 Columbus FC
1979 Columbus Umberto
1980 Columbus Umberto
1981 Cliff Avenue United
1982 Vancouver Firefighters
1983 Vancouver Firefighters
1984 Discovery ’84 FC
1985 Norvan ANAF #45 FC
1986 Norvan ANAF #45 FC
1987 Queen’s Park Rangers
1988 Dartmen FC
1989 West Van Trollers
1990 Burnaby Lake Clubhouse
1991 Vancouver Firefighters
1992 Club Ireland FC
1993 Club Ireland FC
1994 Westside Rino
1995 Wesburn
1996 Croatia SC
1997 Croatia SC
1998 Croatia SC
1999 Indo-Canadians
2000 Westside FC 'A'
2001 ICSF Inter
2002 Westside Rino
2003 Westside Rino
2004 Pegasus FC
2005 Croatia SC
2006 Columbus-Clan FC
2007 Columbus-Clan FC
2008 Surrey United
2009 West Van FC
2010 Surrey United Firefighters
2011 West Van FC
2012 Delta Hurricanes FC
2013 Inter FC
2014 West Van FC
2015 EDC FC Burnaby
2016 Coquitlam Metro-Ford Wolves
2017 Pegasus FC
2018 Rino's Tigers
2019 West Van FC
2020 No Competition
2021 VUFC Hibernian

Premier Division Champions

1982–83 Firefighters “A”
1983–84 Firefighters “A”
1984–85 Firefighters “A”
1985–86 Firefighters “A”
1986–87 Firefighters “A”
1987–88 Firefighters “A”
1988–89 Metro-Ford Wolves
1989–90 Norvan SC
1990–91 Norvan SC
1991–92 Metro-Ford Wolves
1992–93 Metro-Ford Wolves
1993–94 Vancouver Westside FC
1994–95 North Shore Pegasus
1995–96 North Shore Pegasus
1996–97 Sapperton Rovers
1997–98 Firefighters “A”
1998–99 Vancouver Westside FC
1999–00 Vancouver Westside FC
2000–01 Vancouver Westside FC
2001–02 Surrey United
2002–03 Vancouver Westside FC
2003–04 Surrey United
2004–05 ICSF Inter
2005–06 Surrey United
2006–07 ICSF Inter
2007–08 Sporting Club of Vancouver
2008–09 West Van FC
2009-10 Surrey United Firefighters
2010-11 Surrey United Firefighters
2011-12 ICST Pegasus
2012-13 Columbus FC
2013-14 West Van FC
2014-15 West Van FC
2015-16 Metro-Ford Wolves
2016-17 Metro-Ford Wolves
2017-18 BCT Rovers Tigers United
2018-19 Croatia SC
2019-20 Rino's Tigers Vancouver 
2020-21 Season canceled
2021-22 BB5 United

References

External links
 

Soccer in British Columbia
Sports leagues in British Columbia
Soccer leagues in British Columbia